El cebichito is a 2015 Peruvian comedy film written and directed by Martin Landeo. It stars Estéfano Buchelli and Carlos Noriega. It premiered on November 5, 2015, in Peruvian theaters.

Synopsis 
The entanglements of this couple of friends begin when Fabián invites two friends to the beach house, under the pretext of celebrating Sebastián's birthday to put into practice the benefits of the spiciest, tastiest dish and, above all, the most aphrodisiac: the black shell cebichito. Two phone calls surprise Sebastián. The first, from his mother, who accompanied by her aunts, devotees of the Holy Virgin of the Condemned, goes to greet him and pray for his health. And, the second, from Paula, who will give him the surprise of his life.

Cast 
The actors participating in this film are:

 Estéfano Buchelli as Sebastián
 Carlos Noriega as Fabián
 Glenda Flores
 Tara Morales Bermudez
 Cecilia Tosso
 Yraida Vasquez
 Flor Castillo
 Patricia Medina
 Pedro Olórtegui
 Margie Córdova
 Ramón García as Inspector

Production 
The film began its principal photography in 2011 in Lunahuaná, Pucusana, at the Ricardo Palma University, and with some sequences on location in Chorrillos.

Reception 
The film drew 1,066 viewers in its entire run in theaters.

References 

2015 films
2015 comedy films
Peruvian comedy films
2010s Spanish-language films
2010s Peruvian films
Films set in Peru
Films shot in Peru
Films about friendship
Films about chefs
Films about food and drink